The Hero is a two-act opera by Italian-American composer Gian Carlo Menotti commissioned by the Opera Company of Philadelphia, to celebrate the United States Bicentennial. The work premiered at the Philadelphia Academy of Music on June 1, 1976. At this point of his career, Menotti's style of composition, which rejected the avant-garde, was out of favor with the classical music world. Time stated in its review of the opera, "Most of Menotti's music is passable Puccini: melodic, easy to take—and totally beside the point in 1976."

Roles

References
Notes

1976 operas
English-language operas
Operas by Gian Carlo Menotti
Operas